Alina Milevska (born 20 June 1995) is a Ukrainian figure skater. She is a three-time Ukrainian senior national silver medalist and competed at three World Junior Championships. Ranked 14th in the short program, she qualified for the final segment at the 2010 World Junior Championships in The Hague and went on to finish 21st overall. She is a figure skating coach in Irvine, California.  She is a coach as part of #TeamRaf - Rafael Arutyunyan’s program.

Programs

Competitive highlights 
JGP: Junior Grand Prix

References

External links 
 
 

1995 births
Ukrainian female single skaters
Living people
Sportspeople from Kyiv